The Office of the Los Angeles County Counsel is a public law office that serves as legal counsel to the Los Angeles County Board of Supervisors and other County agencies.

History 
The Office of the Los Angeles County Counsel was established in 1913 pursuant to the Los Angeles County Charter and the California Constitution.

County Counsel 
The Office of the County Counsel is headed by the Los Angeles County Counsel, an appointed County officer whose duties include providing legal advice and representation to the Los Angeles County Board of Supervisors, County officers, County departments, and various other public agencies in civil matters.

References

External links 
 

1913 establishments in California
Government of Los Angeles County, California
Local government in California
Organizations based in Los Angeles
Legal advocacy organizations in the United States